Chaleh Chaleh (also Romanized as Chāleh Chāleh; also known as Chāleh Chūleh) is a village in Firuzabad Rural District, Firuzabad District, Selseleh County, Lorestan Province, Iran. According to 2006 census, its population was 81, in 19 families.

References 

Towns and villages in Selseleh County